The 2016–17 Louisiana–Monroe Warhawks men's basketball team represented the University of Louisiana at Monroe in the 2016–17 NCAA Division I men's basketball season. The Warhawks were led by seventh-year head coach Keith Richard, played their home games at Fant–Ewing Coliseum as members of the Sun Belt Conference. They finished the season 9–24, 2–16 in Sun Belt play to finish in last place. In the Sun Belt tournament, they defeated Arkansas State before losing to Texas State in the quarterfinals.

Previous season
The Warhawks finished the 2015–16 season 20–14, 15–5 in Sun Belt play to finish in second place. They defeated Texas–Arlington in the semifinals of the Sun Belt tournament before losing to Little Rock in the championship game. They received an invitation to the CollegeInsider.com Tournament where they lost in the first round to Furman.

Roster

Schedule and results

|-
!colspan=9 style=| Exhibition

|-
!colspan=9 style=| Non-conference regular season

|-
!colspan=9 style=| Sun Belt Conference regular season

|-
!colspan=9 style=| Sun Belt tournament

References

Louisiana–Monroe Warhawks men's basketball seasons
Louisiana-Monroe